Sturt Pond is a   Local Nature Reserve in Milford on Sea in Hampshire. It is owned and managed by Milford On Sea Parish Council. It is part of Solent and Southampton Water Ramsar site and  Special Protection Area, of Solent Maritime Special Area of Conservation and of Hurst Castle and Lymington River Estuary, which is a  Site of Special Scientific Interest.

Sturt Pond itself is tidal, and the reserve also includes Dane Stream, reedbeds, lagoons and saltmarsh. These habitats attract many birds, and there is also an area of grassland which is grazed by New Forest ponies.

References

Local Nature Reserves in Hampshire